Luis Calderón Mendiolaza (17 June 1929 – 24 May 2022) was a Peruvian footballer who played as a midfielder for Carlos Concha, Sport Boys, Universitario and KDT Nacional, as well as the Peru national team.

References

1929 births
2022 deaths
Peruvian footballers
Footballers from Lima
Association football midfielders
Peru international footballers
Club Carlos Concha players
Sport Boys footballers
Club Universitario de Deportes footballers
KDT Nacional players